Konar Esmail (also Romanized as Konār Esmā‘īl, Kenār Esmā‘īl, Konār-e Esmā‘īl) is a village in Band-e Zarak Rural District, in the Central District of Minab County, Hormozgan Province, Iran. At the 2006 census, its population was 701, in 117 families.

References 

Populated places in Minab County